Smoked sable (also known as sable, sablefish, or smoked black cod), is sablefish that has been smoked. Smoked sable is often prepared with paprika.

Alongside lox, hot-smoked whitefish, mackerel, and trout, Jewish delis often sell sablefish (also sometimes referred to as black cod in its fresh state). Smoked sablefish, often called simply "sable", has long been a staple of New York appetizing stores, one of many smoked fish products usually eaten with bagels for breakfast or lunch in American Jewish cuisine.

While "sable" or "sablefish" is the common name, delis often are not serving sablefish, but rather other types of "black cod" within the Anoplopomatidae family of fish. "Black cod" is a common marketing term for fish within this family.

See also

 List of smoked foods
 Smoked fish
 Smoked salmon
 Whitefish salad

References

External links

Black cod: Searing rather than shmearing

Anoplopomatidae
Ashkenazi Jewish cuisine
Ashkenazi Jewish culture in the United States
Jewish American cuisine
Smoked fish